Qatur Rural District is in Qatur District of Khoy County, West Azerbaijan province, Iran. At the National Census of 2006, its population was 14,894 in 2,610 households. There were 12,448 inhabitants in 2,653 households at the following census of 2011. At the most recent census of 2016, the population of the rural district was 11,105 in 2,645 households. The largest of its 29 villages was Makhin, with 1,306 people.

References 

Khoy County

Rural Districts of West Azerbaijan Province

Populated places in West Azerbaijan Province

Populated places in Khoy County